The Fontaine de Charonne, formerly known as Fontaine Trogneux, is a historic fountain in Paris, France.

Location
The fountain is located on the corner of rue du Faubourg-Saint-Antoine and rue de Charonne.

History
The fountain was built from 1719 to 1724 for the inhabitants of Faubourg Saint-Antoine to have access to water. It was designed by architect Jean Beausire. It was named after Mr. Trogneux, a brewer who lived in the neighbourhood.

The fountain was refurbished from 1806 to 1810, and it was restored in 1963.

Architectural significance
It has been listed as a national historical monument since 1995.

References

Fountains in Paris
Buildings and structures completed in 1724
Monuments historiques of Paris
18th-century architecture in France